This article lists existing and demolished council commissioned high-rise apartment buildings in the City of Leeds.  High-rise being defined as being eight stories or more.

Armley

Beckett Park

Beeston

Bramley

Burley

Burmantofts

Chapel Allerton

Cottingley

Farnley

Farsley

Gipton

Gledhow

Halton Moor

Harehills

Holbeck

Ireland Wood

Killingbeck

Kirkstall

Lincoln Green

Little London

Moor Alleron

Moor Grange

Saxton Gardens

Seacroft

Swarcliffe

West Park

Woodhouse

Wortley

See also
Architecture of Leeds
Brutalism in Sheffield
Glasgow tower blocks
 List of tallest buildings and structures in Leeds

References

External links

Buildings and structures in Leeds
Housing in England
History of Leeds
Brutalist architecture in Leeds
Leeds-related lists